Kenneth Allen McDuff (March 21, 1946 – November 17, 1998) was an American serial killer. He was convicted in 1966 of murdering 16-year-old Edna Sullivan, her boyfriend, 17-year-old Robert Brand, and Brand's cousin, 15-year-old Mark Dunnam, who was visiting from California. They were all strangers whom McDuff abducted after noticing Sullivan. McDuff repeatedly raped her before breaking her neck with a broomstick.

McDuff was given three death sentences that were reduced to life imprisonment consequently to the 1972 U.S. Supreme Court ruling Furman v. Georgia. He was paroled in 1989 and went on to kill again. He was executed in 1998, and is suspected to have been responsible for many other killings.

Early life and background
Kenneth Allen McDuff was born at 201 Linden Street in the central Texas town of Rosebud, the fifth of six children born to John Allen "JA" and Addie McDuff. His father ran a successful concrete business during the Texas construction boom of the 1960s. McDuff was indulged by his family, particularly his mother Addie, nicknamed the "pistol packing mama" because she threatened a school bus driver with a gun after the driver kicked McDuff's twin brother Lonnie off the bus.

At Rosebud High School, McDuff earned the reputation of being a bully. He was careful to pick on weaker individuals after the large but not strong McDuff lost a fight he had picked with an athletic and popular boy named Tommy Sammons. As a result, he quit school and worked for his father's business doing manual labor. McDuff would often brag in later interviews that old ladies loved the way he mowed their lawns, making others jealous. McDuff was convicted of a series of burglaries and put in prison.

Earlier criminal activities
McDuff's criminal record began two years before his first murder conviction. In 1964, at age 18, McDuff was convicted of 12 counts of burglary and attempted burglary in three Texas counties: Bell, Milam, and Falls. He was sentenced to 12 four-year prison terms to be served concurrently. He made parole in December 1965.

McDuff briefly returned to prison after becoming involved in a fight, but was soon released. While he had not been convicted of any murders at this time, his accomplice in the 1966 triple murder, Roy Dale Green, said that McDuff bragged openly about his criminal record and claimed to have raped and killed two young women.

Broomstick murders
On August 6, 1966, McDuff and Green, whom he had met around a month earlier through a mutual acquaintance, spent the day pouring concrete for McDuff's father. They then drove around, as McDuff said he was looking for a girl. At 10 pm, Robert Brand (aged 17), his girlfriend Edna Louise Sullivan (aged 16), and Brand's 15-year-old cousin Mark Dunman were standing beside their parked car on a baseball field in Everman, Texas.

While cruising around, McDuff noticed Sullivan and parked around 150 yards away from the soon-to-be victims. He threatened the trio with his .38 Colt revolver and ordered them to get into the trunk of their car. With Green following in McDuff's car, McDuff drove the victims' Ford along a highway and then into a field, where he ordered Sullivan out of the trunk of the Ford and instructed Green to put her into the trunk of his Dodge Coronet. At this point, according to Green's statement, McDuff said he would have to "knock 'em off"; he proceeded to fire six shots into the trunk of the Ford in spite of Dunman and Brand's pleas not to. McDuff then instructed Green to wipe the fingerprints off the Ford.

After driving to another location, McDuff and Green, the latter allegedly under duress, raped Sullivan. After she was raped repeatedly, McDuff asked Green for something with which to strangle her. Green gave him his belt. However, in the end, McDuff opted to use a  piece of broomstick from his car. He choked Sullivan, and then Green and he dumped her body in some bushes. They purchased Coca-Cola from a Hillsboro gas station before driving to Green's house to spend the night. The following day, McDuff buried his revolver beside Green's garage, and their mutual acquaintance Richard Boyd allowed McDuff to wash his car at his house. The next day, Green confessed to Boyd's parents, who told Green's mother, who convinced him to turn himself in. McDuff was arrested by Falls County Sheriff Brady Pamplin (who served with Texas Rangers before serving in World War II with United States Army Air Corps) and Deputy U.S. Marshal Thomas Parnell “T.P.” McNamara, Sr.

McDuff received a death sentence in Texas' electric chair; Green received a 25-year sentence and was released in 1979. McDuff's death sentence was commuted to a life sentence, and he hired a lawyer, who amassed a dossier of various evidence that claimed to show that Green was the real killer. Some members of the parole board were impressed by the dossier. During a one-on-one interview with a board member, McDuff offered him a bribe to secure a favorable decision on the parole application. He was given a two-year sentence for trying to bribe the official. It proved meaningless, as board members thought McDuff could still "contribute to society" and decided to grant him a parole. He was released in 1989.

Post-release crimes

McDuff was one of 20 former death-row inmates and 127 murderers to be paroled. After being released, he got a job at a gas station making $4 an hour while taking a class at Texas State Technical College in Waco. Within three days of his release,  he is widely believed to have begun killing again. The body of 29-year-old Sarafia Parker was discovered on October 14, 1989, in Temple, a town 48 miles south of Waco along the I-35 corridor. McDuff was not charged with this crime. However, he was soon returned to prison on a parole violation for making death threats to an African American youth in Rosebud.

Addie McDuff paid $1,500, plus an additional $700 for expenses, to two Huntsville attorneys in return for their "evaluating" her son's prospect of release. On December 18, 1990, McDuff was again released from prison. On the night of October 10, 1991, he picked up a prostitute named Brenda Thompson in Waco. He tied her up, but then stopped his truck about 50 ft from a police checkpoint. When a policeman walked toward McDuff's vehicle, Thompson repeatedly kicked at the windshield of McDuff's truck, cracking it several times.

McDuff accelerated very quickly and drove at the officers. According to a statement filed by the officers later, three of them had to jump to avoid being hit. The policemen gave chase, but McDuff eluded them by turning off his lights and traveling the wrong way down one-way streets. Ultimately, he parked his truck in a wooded area near U.S. Route 84 and tortured Thompson to death. Her body was not discovered until 1998.

Five days later, on October 15, 1991, McDuff and a 17-year-old prostitute named Regenia DeAnne Moore were witnessed having an argument at a Waco motel. Shortly thereafter, the pair drove in McDuff's pickup truck to a remote area beside Texas State Highway 6, near Waco. McDuff tied her arms and legs with stockings before killing her. She had been missing from home for 7 years by the time her body was discovered on September 29, 1998. McDuff is also believed to have murdered Cynthia Renee Gonzalez, 23, who was found dead in a creek bed near County Road 313 in heavily wood terrain 1 mile west of I-35 on September 21, 1991, some six days after she was reported missing in Arlington.

McDuff and an accomplice, Alva Hank Worley, murdered Colleen Reed, a Louisiana native, on December 29, 1991. McDuff and Worley drove to an Austin car wash and kidnapped Reed in plain sight of eyewitnesses before driving away. Worley admitted in an April 1992 interview with the Bell County Sheriff's Department that he had raped Reed and tortured her with cigarettes, but he stated that he did not participate in her murder.

McDuff's next victim was Valencia Joshua, a prostitute who was last seen alive knocking on McDuff's door. He strangled Joshua on February 24, 1992. Her body was discovered on March 15 at a golf course near their college. Next was Melissa Northrup, a 22-year-old store clerk at a Waco Quik-Pak (the same store that McDuff had worked in at one point), who was pregnant when she went missing from the store. The kidnapper also took $250 from the cash register. McDuff was a suspect because he had been seen in the vicinity of the Quik-Pak at the time of Northrup's disappearance. During the investigation before the body was found, a college friend of McDuff's told police officers that he had attempted to enlist his help in robbing the store. Northrup died on March 1, 1992, and a fisherman found her body on April 26.

A major problem for investigators was that McDuff's post-release victims were spread out across several Texas counties. This made a single coordinated investigation difficult. However, the police learned that McDuff was peddling drugs and had an illegal firearm, both federal offenses. Consequently, on March 6, 1992, a local state attorney issued a warrant for his arrest. In April 1992, Bell County investigators had brought in Worley for questioning on the basis that he was a known acquaintance of McDuff's. Worley admitted to his involvement in the kidnapping of Reed. He was held in a Travis County jail while the police continued their search for McDuff.

McDuff had moved to Kansas City, Missouri, where he was working at a refuse collection company and living under the assumed name of Richard Fowler. On May 1, 1992, a coworker of his named Gary Smithee watched the Fox television program America's Most Wanted. Smithee noticed how similar McDuff, who was featured on the program, was to his new co-worker. After discussing the matter with another co-worker, Smithee telephoned the Kansas City Police Department, which searched Fowler's name and found he had been arrested and fingerprinted for soliciting prostitutes. A comparison of the fingerprints taken from Fowler to those of McDuff showed they were the same. On May 4, 1992, a surveillance team of six officers arrested McDuff as he drove to a landfill south of Kansas City. The arresting officers included Deputy U.S. Marshal Thomas Parnell McNamara, Jr., his brother, Deputy U.S. Marshal Mike McNamara, and Falls County Sheriff Larry Pamplin, whose fathers had arrested McDuff in 1966.

Victims

Trial and execution 

McDuff was indicted on one count of capital murder for Northrup's murder in McLennan County, Texas, on June 26, 1992. He was found guilty. In Texas, juries determine whether or not an individual convicted of capital murder receives life imprisonment or the death penalty. Journalist Gary Cartwright expressed the hope he would be executed, saying: "If there has ever been a good argument for the death penalty, it's Kenneth McDuff."

On February 18, 1993, the jury, in a special punishment hearing, opted to sentence him to death. Following a number of delays while appeals were heard, the Western District Court denied habeas corpus relief and rescheduled the execution date for November 17, 1998. As he was denied authorization for another, he gave up Reed's burial location a few weeks before his execution.

McDuff is buried in the Captain Joe Byrd Cemetery, also known as "Peckerwood Hill", in Huntsville, Texas.  Prisoners buried there are those whose family chose not to claim their remains. His headstone contains only his date of execution (11-17-98), an "X" (meaning that he was executed by the State of Texas), and his death row number (999055).  His last meal, according to death-row chef Brian Price, was a hamburger fashioned to resemble his request of a steak.

See also
 Capital punishment in Texas
 Capital punishment in the United States
 List of people executed in Texas, 1990–1999
 List of serial killers by number of victims
 List of serial killers in the United States

References

Bibliography

External links
The Many Faces of Kenneth Allen McDuff. Gary M. Lavergne. Retrieved on 2012-01-
U.S. Executions Since 1976

1946 births
1998 deaths
20th-century executions by Texas
20th-century executions of American people
American murderers of children
American rapists
Executed American serial killers
Executed people from Texas
Male serial killers
People convicted of murder by Texas
People executed by Texas by lethal injection
People from Rosebud, Texas
People with antisocial personality disorder